Govind Hari Deshpande  was an Indian politician. He was elected to the Lok Sabha, the lower house of the Parliament of India as a member of the Indian National Congress.

References

External links
Official biographical sketch in Parliament of India website

India MPs 1967–1970
India MPs 1971–1977
Lok Sabha members from Maharashtra
1902 births
Year of death missing
India MPs 1962–1967
People from Nashik district
Indian independence activists from Maharashtra